St. Vincent de Paul Church is a Roman Catholic parish and Los Angeles Historic-Cultural Monument (No. 90) in the South Los Angeles section of Los Angeles, California. The church was built in the 1920s and designed by architect Albert C. Martin, Sr. Paid for by local oilman Edward L. Doheny and thus is known colloquially as "the Church of Holy Oils." It was dedicated in 1925, it was located in what was then one of the wealthiest sections of the city, on land adjacent to the Stephen Dorsey mansion and Stimson House. It was the second Roman Catholic church in Los Angeles to be consecrated. Composer Amédée Tremblay notably served as the church's organist from 1925–1949. Tremblay was succeeded as organist by the British-born musician John Lee.

The climactic scene of the 1999 film End of Days, featuring Arnold Schwarzenegger's battle against Satan was filmed in the church. The church's altar is featured prominently in the film's final scenes. The church also appears in the movie Constantine. The church was also featured in the Warrant video "The Bitter Pill" (acoustic version), with lead singer Jani Lane performing the song in front of and around the church. The church was also featured in the Charmed episode "When Bad Warlocks Turn Good"; furthermore the church is visible in the Madonna's music video of "God Control", and some parts of it in her video of "Dark Ballet".

See also
 List of Los Angeles Historic-Cultural Monuments in South Los Angeles

References

External links
 
 Big Orange Landmarks blog: St. Vincent de Paul Church — history and images.

Cathedral
Roman Catholic churches in California
Los Angeles Historic-Cultural Monuments
Roman Catholic churches completed in 1925
20th-century Roman Catholic church buildings in the United States
West Adams, Los Angeles
Spanish Colonial Revival architecture in California